Kumutha a/p Raman (Tamil: குமுதா ரகுமான்; 19 May 1979 – 13 July 2021) was a Malaysian politician.

Life
She was a member of the PAS Supporters Club, a club started by the PAS for its non-Muslim supporters. PAS, by virtue of the party's constitution, admits only Muslims as its members. The setting up of the Supporters Club was seen as a small step to open up the membership of the party to non-Muslims who share its ideology and beliefs.

Kumutha was a Hindu and the first non-Muslim to contest for PAS. However she contested under the Parti Keadilan Rakyat (PKR) ticket as the PAS constitution did not allow non-Muslims to contests using its ticket. This was done under a special arrangement with PKR of Pakatan Rakyat (PR) coalition which PAS was also a component later for the 2008 Malaysian general elections. This was an experiment of sorts for PAS as they were opening up their party struggles to non-Muslims and Kumutha was seen as paving the way for a new sort of politics for the Muslim party.

Kumutha was also Johor state PAS sole female candidate to contest a state seat in the 2008 Malaysian general elections. She contested the Tiram state seat, where she was elected and served in the Dewan Rakyat till 2013.

“Education and medical needs will be among the issues I will focus on,” said Kumutha when campaigning for the elections. She added that she would fight for the rights of all races, especially for the abolishment of racial quotas to enter local universities and for free medical services for the poor.

Kumutha, who held a law degree from Britain, worked as bank officer.

Death
On 13 July 2021, Kumutha died at Putrajaya Hospital at afternoon due to COVID-19 in Putrajaya during the pandemic in Malaysia. She was 42.

References

External links
 USA Cruise Log USA Today - 29 February 2008
 Malaysian Hindu woman embraces Islamic party Reuters - 29 February 2008
 PAS to field non-Muslim under PKR ticket, The Star, 23 February 2008.

1979 births
2021 deaths
Malaysian Hindus
Malaysian politicians of Indian descent
Deaths from the COVID-19 pandemic in Malaysia
21st-century Malaysian politicians
Malaysian Islamic Party politicians
Members of the Dewan Rakyat